Callisthenia ruberrima is a moth of the subfamily Arctiinae. It is found in the French Guiana.

References

Lithosiini